Nicole, Nichole, or Nicky Warren may refer to:

Nicky Warren, coiner of "concestor" according to Richard Dawkins in The Ancestor's Tale
Nicole Warren, character in the F. Scott Fitzgerald novel Tender Is the Night
Nicky Warren, character in the television series The Inspector Lynley Mysteries